XBin, or eXtended Binary, is a file format for saving IBM PC text mode images.

Essentially an extension to the normal raw-image BIN (raw memory copy of text mode video memory) files, it provides an enhanced means for saving console graphics superior to ANSI graphics.

The format was created by Belgian programmer Tasmaniac of ACiD, partly in response to the demand for a solution to save images in the BIN image format, which offered no insight as to the size/width of the image. XBin stores its width information internally so that a programmer or user does not need to define this information more than once, an inherent problem with plain BIN files.

XBin also had several notable features above and beyond that of standard text images saved in ANSI format in that it took further advantage of the text mode environment by (optionally) storing alternate palette color information, supporting modified character set fonts and its own simple compression system.

See also
 Standard Architecture for Universal Comment Extensions (SAUCE)
 ID3
 Metadata

References

Further reading

External links
 

Graphics file formats